The Chelsea Arts Club is a private members' club at 143 Old Church Street in Chelsea, London with a membership of over 3,800, including artists, sculptors, architects, writers, designers, actors, musicians, photographers, and filmmakers. The club was established on 21 March 1891 (in Chelsea), as a rival to the older Arts Club in Mayfair, on the instigation of the artist James Abbott McNeill Whistler, who had been a (sometimes controversial) member of the older club.

During its primary season from September–June the Chelsea Arts Club serves as a host for many functions, from instrumental and choral performances to visual arts exhibitions, literary talks, and weekend artist lunches.

Applicants for membership need to be sponsored by two current Members.

The club is located in the former Bolton Lodge, a Grade II listed building on the National Heritage List for England.

History 

The Chelsea Arts Club was originally located in rooms at no. 181 King's Road. In 1902, the club moved to larger premises at no. 143 Old Church Street. In 1933 the club's premises, which had an acre of garden, were remodeled. The clubhouse includes a snooker room, bedrooms, dining room, former 'ladies bar' turned private party room, and a garden.

From 1908 to 1958 the club held a series of public fancy dress balls at the Albert Hall, latterly on New Year's Eve, which raised funds for artists' charities. In 1958, balls were banned from the Albert Hall owing their notoriety for rowdiness, nudity and public homosexuality (illegal before 1967). Subsequently, private functions were held at the club instead, with similarly lavish decorations and themes.

In 1966 the club was redecorated, a new bar was opened, and membership was opened to women artists.

Although normally a plain white building, the club exterior is occasionally painted to coincide with a themed event. It has been painted by set designer Tony Common. In 2010 it was painted bright colours with images of circus performers, and in 2011 was painted to appear as if it had been bombed in order to coincide with celebrations marking 70 years since the end of The Blitz.

See also
 Gentlemen's club
 List of gentlemen's clubs in London

References

 Anthony Lejeune, Gentlemen's Clubs of London, London: Macdonald And Jane's, 1979 (ill. Malcolm Lewis). .
 Tom Cross, Artists and Bohemians: 100 Years with the Chelsea Arts Club, London: Quiller Press, 1992. .

External links
 
 News footage of the 1922 new years ball (British Pathe)
 News footage of the 1954 new years ball (British Pathe)
 Membership proposal form

1891 establishments in England
19th-century art groups
Arts in London
Arts organizations established in 1891
British art
British artist groups and collectives
Chelsea, London
Gentlemen's clubs in London
Grade II listed buildings in the Royal Borough of Kensington and Chelsea